Anthima Theerpu may refer to:

 Anthima Theerpu (1987 film), a Kannada-language film directed by A T Raghu, starring Ambarish and Bharathi.
 Anthima Theerpu (1988 film), a Telugu-language film directed by Joshiy, starring Krishnamraju and Thiagarajan.
 Anthima Theerpu (2011 film), a Telugu-language dubbed film directed by Baburaj, starring  Suresh Gopi and Vani Viswanath,.